Paratopic is a 2018 first-person horror video game, released for Linux, macOS, Windows, Nintendo Switch, Xbox One and Xbox Series. The game uses a graphical style reminiscent of 32-bit era graphics. Later that year, a "Definitive Cut" edition added new locations and objects. Paratopic won the "Excellence in Audio" category at the 2019 Independent Games Festival Awards.

Plot 
The game is presented as short gameplay segments with stories that connect vaguely to each other that frequently and abruptly shift. The narrative is shown out of order in-game. The following is a summarization of the order as the story segments appear.

In a hallway-like building, an unnamed Smuggler is interrogated about possessing undeclared videotapes by a security guard. The guard goes into a room to watch some of the tapes. The room becomes enveloped in a blinding white light. The game abruptly shifts to a diner. An unnamed female Assassin is instructed to retrieve videotapes for her employer. Outside, a corpse can be seen being eaten by birds. She is told to smuggle them across a "border" once she retrieves them. Now alone in the diner, the Assassin, armed with a revolver, kicks open a door in the back of the diner, revealing a man standing next to a mysterious symbol.  The game abruptly cuts to an apartment complex. A person (ostensibly the Smuggler), en route to their apartment, is told by a neighbor that she witnessed a group of men breaking into the Smuggler's apartment. Inside the Smuggler's apartment is a lamp, numerous boxes filled with what appears to be liquified flesh, a bare mattress, and a box, adorned with the same symbol from the diner, filled with videotapes. The Smuggler's neighbor abruptly appears, requesting a "juicy" videotape. It is left up to the player as to whether the Smuggler gives her a tape or not. If the neighbor is given a tape, she is seen watching it in her room, only for her face to split open.

The game abruptly cuts to a person (again, ostensibly, the Smuggler) driving a car down a deserted city highway. In the passenger seat, a revolver and the videotape box frequently change places on the seat. The game abruptly cuts to a gas station mini-mart. The Smuggler makes small talk with the mini-mart cashier while their car gets gas. Outside, a monstrous, dark figure stands over the car. The game abruptly cuts to an unnamed female Birdwatcher, armed with a camera, walking through a forest, taking pictures of crows. The Birdwatcher stumbles upon a clearing, witnessing a massive dome-like structure in the distance, as well as a windmill that bears a strong resemblance to the windmill in the diner symbol. In a completely missable area, the Birdwatcher discovers an underground room with multiple television screens, which play a fragmented recording of a man from the enigmatic "Power Company". The man addresses an unknown group of people (ostensibly his coworkers) and the "sacrifices" they make for the sake of a "better future". After discovering a cliffside trail, the game cuts to the Smuggler, in the car again. The Smuggler leaves the city and enters a countryside-like area. The game then cuts back to the Birdwatcher, who wanders through an area filled with mangled and ruined metallic structures and shipping crates. The shipping crates are marked with the symbol from the diner. There are active security cameras that appear to be watching the birdwatcher. Eventually, the Birdwatcher stumbles upon a radio tower, beneath which is a black, monstrous creature that warps and distorts the Birdwatcher's camera feed. The monster then teleports behind the Birdwatcher and attacks her.

The game then cuts to the Smuggler, in the car once more, as they drive through the countryside. Numerous destroyed and mangled objects can be seen in the background. The game then cuts to the gas station. The Smuggler, apparently there a second time, again makes conversation with the mini-mart cashier while their car fills up with gas. The dark creature can again be seen beside the car. The game then cuts back to the Assassin as they break into the diner's back room. She kills the man, who was watching some of the tapes she was hired to retrieve. She watches one herself. The television screen she views it on displays nothing but static, but the Assassin is moved back in time to the moment she kills the man every time she views a tape. The game then abruptly cuts back to the scene that was playing out at the start of the game. The security guard walks out of the room, but a flickering television is in the place of his head and he appears to be nearly bisected. His body then unravels and vanishes into thin air, leaving only the television, which displays the message "BE SEEING YOU, FRIENDO." The game then abruptly cuts to the Assassin, armed with her revolver, walking through the forest where the Birdwatcher was. The Assassin stumbles upon the Birdwatcher's skinless, headless, warped, still-moving body, wrapped around a pole, with the camera the Birdwatcher had at the foot of the pole. The Assassin takes the camera. The game ends with the Assassin reporting the Birdwatcher's body to emergency services via telephone, hanging up when the operator asks for the Assassin's name.

Reception 

The game received average-to-positive reviews from critics. While critics praised the visuals and the game's tense, unnerving atmosphere, criticism fell on the game's short length, the story's abrupt ending, and monotonous gameplay segments.

References

Further reading

External links 
 

2018 video games
Indie video games
Linux games
MacOS games
Windows games
2010s horror video games
Single-player video games
Independent Games Festival winners